Rosalía Gómez Lasheras (born 1994, in Santiago de Compostela) is a Spanish pianist.

Life 
She studied at Santiago Conservatory, and at Utrecht Conservatory, with the American professor Alan Weiss. In 2013 she won the Young Pianist Foundation competition.

References

External links 
 http://www.rosaliagomezlasheras.com/en/bio/

Living people
1994 births